In Norse mythology, Þriði ("Third"), anglicized as Thridi, is either one of the many names of Odin given in Grimnismal (46) or the name of one of the three characters (along with Hárr and Jafnhárr) questioned by king Gylfi in Snorri Sturluson's Gylfaginning.

Characters in Norse mythology
Names of Odin